Robert Thomas Miller (September 21, 1893 – April 30, 1962) was the mayor of Austin, Texas for 22 years, from 1933 to 1949 and again from 1955 to 1961. The Tom Miller Dam is named after him.

References

1962 deaths
Mayors of Austin, Texas
1893 births
20th-century American politicians